Yara Sayeh Shahidi (born February 10, 2000) is an American actress. She gained recognition for her starring role as the oldest daughter Zoey Johnson on the sitcom Black-ish (2014–2022) and its spin-off series Grown-ish (2018–present). Her film credits include Imagine That (2009), Smallfoot (2018), and the lead role in The Sun Is Also a Star (2019). Time included her on "The 30 Most Influential Teens of 2016" list.

Early life
Yara Sayeh Shahidi was born in Minneapolis, Minnesota, to Keri Salter Shahidi and Afshin Shahidi, a photographer. Her mother, Keri Shahidi (born Keri Jamelda Salter), is of Black-American and Choctaw heritage, whereas her father Afshin Shahidi is Iranian. Afshin was one of the principal photographers for musician Prince until his death in 2016. Prince also kept a signed photo of Yara in his editing suit at Paisley Park, which can be seen on the VIP Tour. The Shahidi family moved to California for Afshin's work when Yara was 4 years old. She is the older sister of child actor and model Sayeed Shahidi and they have a younger brother, Ehsan. The rapper Nas is her cousin.

Her mother Keri states her daughter's first name Yara means "Someone who is close to your heart" in Farsi. Shahidi is also a common surname in Iran, of Muslim origin, which means "witness" in Farsi.

Shahidi graduated in 2017 from Dwight Global Online School. Starting in 2018, Shahidi began college at Harvard University with a plan to major in Interdisciplinary Sociology and Black American Studies.

Career 

Shahidi began her career when she was 6 years old, appearing in television commercials and print advertisements for companies such as McDonald's, Ralph Lauren, Target, GapKids, Disney, Guess Kids and The Children's Place. She frequently worked with her mother and younger brother in various print and broadcast campaigns.

Shahidi made her cinematic debut in 2009, starring opposite Eddie Murphy in Paramount Pictures' Imagine That, for which she received a Young Artist Award nomination for the best performance in a feature film category. She also appeared in the Angelina Jolie action film Salt in 2010 as a next door neighbor. In 2012, she played Chloe Johnson, the daughter of President William Johnson, in the TV series The First Family.

Starting in September 2014, Shahidi began her role in ABC's prime-time comedy Black-ish as 14-year-old Zoey Johnson. In December 2014 she won an NAACP Image Award in the category of 'Best Supporting Actress in a Comedy'.

In 2016, she signed to model with New York's Women Management modeling agency, in hopes of providing a platform to see more women of color in diverse roles.

ABC announced in 2017 that Shahidi would be headlining a Black-ish spinoff, titled Grown-ish, on its sister network Freeform. The series premiered on January 3, 2018.

She was ranked one of the best dressed women in 2018 by fashion website Net-a-Porter.

She was one of fifteen women selected to appear on the cover of the September 2019 issue of British Vogue, by guest editor Meghan, Duchess of Sussex.

In 2020, Shahidi and her mother launched their production company 7th Sun and signed a deal with ABC Studios to produce shows. She was cast as Tinker Bell in the upcoming Peter Pan remake Peter Pan & Wendy. and will appear in the Apple TV+ anthology series Extrapolations.

In 2021, Shahidi debuted a sportswear collaboration with Adidas.

Activism 
Shahidi founded Eighteen x 18 with social news publisher NowThis, which "will be a platform to encourage [her] peers to vote for the very first time in our upcoming midterm elections." Her other organizations include Yara's Club a partnership with Young Women's Leadership Network (YWLN) of New York, which provides online mentorship in hopes to end poverty through education.

Shahidi's activism was noticed by former first lady Michelle Obama, who wrote her a letter of recommendation to Harvard University. She was also given the opportunity by Teen Vogue to interview Hillary Clinton in 2017.

In 2021, Yara Shahidi joined the Dior Stand with Women campaign.

Filmography

Film

Television

See also
 List of famous Iranian women
 List of Iranian-Americans
 List of African Americans

References

External links
 
 
 

2000 births
Living people
21st-century American actresses
Actresses from Minneapolis
Actresses of Iranian descent
African-American actresses
American child actresses
American child activists
American film actresses
American people of Choctaw descent
American people who self-identify as being of Native American descent
American people of Iranian descent
American television actresses
American voice actresses
American people of Iranian-African descent
21st-century African-American women
21st-century African-American people
20th-century African-American people
20th-century African-American women
Harvard College alumni